The 2022 UEFA Women's Champions League Final was the final match of the 2021–22 UEFA Women's Champions League, the 21st season of Europe's premier women's club football tournament organised by UEFA, and the 13th season since it was renamed from the UEFA Women's Cup to the UEFA Women's Champions League. The match was played at the Juventus Stadium in Turin, Italy on 21 May 2022, between Spanish club Barcelona and French club Lyon.

Lyon won the match 3–1 for their eighth UEFA Women's Champions League title.

Teams
In the following table, finals until 2009 were in the UEFA Women's Cup era, since 2010 were in the UEFA Women's Champions League era.

Venue

The Juventus Stadium was selected as the final host by the UEFA Executive Committee during their meeting in Amsterdam, Netherlands on 2 March 2020.

The match was the first UEFA Women's Cup/Champions League final to be held in Turin, and the second in Italy after the 2016 final, held in Reggio Emilia. The match was the second UEFA club competition final to be held at the stadium, having previously hosted the 2014 UEFA Europa League Final. It was also the seventh UEFA club competition final to be held in Turin, having hosted four other UEFA Cup/Europa League finals (holding a leg in 1977, 1990, 1992 and 1993), as well as the 1984 European Super Cup.

Road to the final

Note: In all results below, the score of the finalist is given first (H: home; A: away).

Pre-match

Officials
On 11 May 2022, UEFA named Finnish official Lina Lehtovaara as the referee for the final. Lehtovaara had been a FIFA referee since 2009, and was previously the fourth official in the 2010 UEFA Women's Champions League Final. She served as a fourth official at UEFA Women's Euro 2017, and was selected as a referee for UEFA Women's Euro 2022. She officiated three prior matches in the 2021–22 Women's Champions League season, with two matches in the group stage and one quarter-final leg. She was joined by Chrysoula Kourompylia of Greece and Karolin Kaivoja of Estonia as assistant referees. Czech referee Jana Adámková served as the fourth official, with her compatriot Lucie Ratajová working as the reserve assistant referee. Portuguese referees Tiago Martins and João Pinheiro worked as the VAR and assistant VAR officials, respectively, while Paolo Valeri of Italy was the support VAR.

Match

Details
The "home" team (for administrative purposes) was determined by an additional draw held on 20 December 2021, 13:00 CET (after the quarter-final and semi-final draws), at the UEFA headquarters in Nyon, Switzerland.

Statistics

See also
2022 UEFA Champions League Final
2022 UEFA Europa League Final
2022 UEFA Europa Conference League Final
2022 UEFA Super Cup

Notes

References

External links

2022
Final
May 2022 sports events in Italy
2021–22 in Italian women's football
Sports competitions in Turin
Football in Turin
2020s in Turin
International club association football competitions hosted by Italy
International women's association football competitions hosted by Italy
FC Barcelona Femení
Women's Champions League Final
Olympique Lyonnais Féminin matches
Women's Champions League Final